Peadar Carton (born 2 April 1986) is a hurler who plays inter-county senior hurling for Dublin and for his club O'Tooles. His brother Michael also hurls for Dublin and O'Tooles.

Peadar scored 1-2 for Dublin U21s in the Leinster final victory over Offaly at Parnell Park in July 2007

Honours
Leinster Under-21 Hurling Championship (1): 2007

References

External links
 O'Tooles' GAC Official Website
 Official Dublin GAA Website
 Official Peadar Carton Hurley Site

Living people
1986 births
Dual players
Dublin inter-county hurlers
O'Tooles hurlers
People educated at St. Declan's College, Dublin